Bălești is a commune in Gorj County, Oltenia, Romania. It is composed of nine villages: Bălești, Ceauru, Cornești, Găvănești, Rasova, Stolojani, Tălpășești, Tămășești, and Voinigești.

The commune is located in the north-central part of the county. It is traversed by the DN67 road, which connects the county seat, Târgu Jiu, to Drobeta-Turnu Severin.

The commune's Church of the Holy Archangels dates to 1679.

Natives
 Nicolae Militaru

References

Communes in Gorj County
Localities in Oltenia